Nationality words link to articles with information on the nation's poetry or literature (for instance, Irish or France).

Events

Works published

Great Britain
 Anonymous, Merlin, based on the second of two versions of the Middle English romance Arthur and Merlin, itself derived ultimately from the Old French prose Merlin, part of the Arthurian Vulgate Cycle of the early 13th century
 Stephen Hawes, year uncertain,  publisher: Wynkyn de Worde
 John Lydgate, Proverbs, publication year uncertain; posthumously published; written c. 1431–1438; consists for the most part on extracts from The Fall of Princes 1494
 Sir Thomas More, The Life of Johan Picus Erle of Myrandula, publication year uncertain, a life of Giovanni Pico della Mirandola, Italian humanist and philosopher and member of the Platonic Academy in Florence

Other
Jean Marot, Voyage de Gênes, France
La grant danse macabre (approximate date)

Births
Death years link to the corresponding "[year] in poetry" article:
 Arnoldus Arlenius (died 1582), Dutch humanist philosopher and poet
 Giovanni Darcio, born about this year (died after 1554), Italian, Latin-language poet
 Sebestyén Tinódi Lantos (died 1556), Hungarian lyricist, epic poet, political historian, and minstrel
 Martynas Mažvydas (died 1563), author and editor of the first printed book in the Lithuanian language, including the first poetry
 Thomas Phaer (also spelled Phaire, Faer, Phayre, and Phayer), born about this year (died 1560), English lawyer and translator of poetry
 Anton Francesco Ranieri (died 1560), Italian, Latin-language poet
 Satomura Shokyu 里村昌休 (died 1552), Japanese leading master of the linked verse renga after the death of Tani Sobuko in 1545
 Luigi Tansillo (died 1568), Italian poet of Petrarchan sonnets and Marinist style
 Robert Wedderburn born about this year (died c. 1554), Scottish

Deaths
Birth years link to the corresponding "[year] in poetry" article:
 Guillaume Coquillart (born c. 1450), French
 Giovanni Cotta (born c. 1480), Italian, Latin-language poet
 Pothana (born 1450), Telugu poet best known for his translation of the Bhagavata Purana from Sanskrit to Telugu

See also

 Poetry
 16th century in poetry
 16th century in literature
 French Renaissance literature
 Grands Rhétoriqueurs
 Renaissance literature
 Spanish Renaissance literature

Notes

16th-century poetry
Poetry